Big and Little Petroglyph Canyons are two principal landforms within which are found major accumulations of Paleo-Indian and/or Native American Petroglyphs, or rock art, by the Coso People located in the Coso Range Mountains of the northern Mojave Desert, and now within the Naval Air Weapons Station China Lake, near the towns of China Lake and Ridgecrest, California. Little Petroglyph Canyon contains 20,000 documented images, which surpasses in number for most other collections. Additionally, the archeological resources are remarkably undisturbed.

History
The Coso Petroglyphs have been subject to various interpretations as to their meaning and function.  One perspective argues that the drawings are metaphoric images correlated with individual shamanic vision quests.  Alternatively it has been argued that they are part of a hunting religion that included increase rites and were associated with a sheep cult ceremonial complex. However these alternative explanations might be somewhat complementary in that the medicine persons could have been the artisans but their messages might have often been associated with religious observances centering on the veneration of bighorn sheep.
 
In addition to the extant petroglyph rock art, the Coso People carried out extensive working of obsidian tools and other 'manufacturing.' There is considerable archaeological evidence substantiating trade of these products between the Coso People and other Indigenous peoples of the Americas and Native American tribes. For example, distant trade with the southern Californian Pacific coast Chumash People is confirmed by archaeological recovery from California sites in San Luis Obispo County, California and other coastal indigenous peoples' sites.

Big and Little Petroglyph Canyons are situated on property of the China Lake Naval Air Weapons Station. The two canyons are a designated U.S. National Historic Landmark. In 2001, they were incorporated into a larger National Historic Landmark District, called the Coso Rock Art District.

In 2014, the Ridgecrest Petroglyph Festival was created as an annual celebration and showcase the petroglyphs located in the two canyons.

See also
 Paleo-Indians
 Mesoamerica
 Native Americans in the United States	
 Population history of American indigenous peoples

References

Resources
 Caroline Arnold and Richard Hewett. 1996. Stories in stone: rock art pictures by early Americans, 48 pages, Houghton Mifflin Harcourt, 
 C. Michael Hogan. 2008. Morro Creek, ed. by A. Burnham 
 Mildred Brooke Hoover, Douglas E. Kyle and Hero Rensch. 2002. Historic spots in California, 661 pp, Stanford University Press, 
Alan P. Garfinkel. 2006.  Paradigm Shifts, Rock Art Studies, and the 'Coso Sheep Cult' of Eastern California.  North American Archaeologist 27(3):203-244. 
Alan P. Garfinkel. 2007.  Archaeology and Rock Art of the Eastern Sierra and Great Basin Frontier, Maturango Museum Publication 22, Ridgecrest, California.
Alan P.Garfinkel, Donald R. Austin, David Earle, and Harold Williams. 2009. Myth, Ritual and Rock Art:  Coso Decorated Animal-Humans and the Animal Master. Rock Art Research 26(2):179-197.  The Journal of the Australian Rock Art Research Association (AURA) and of the International Federation of Rock Art Organizations (IFRAO).    
Alan P. Garfinkel, David A. Young, and Robert M. Yohe, II. 2010.  Bighorn Hunting, Resource Depression, and Rock Art in the Coso Range of Eastern California:  A Computer Simulation Model.   Journal of Archaeological Science 37:42-51.  
Alan P.Garfinkel and Donald R. Austin. 2011. Reproductive Symbolism in Great Basin Rock Art:  Bighorn Sheep Hunting, Fertility, and Forager Ideology.  Cambridge Archaeological Journal, 21(3):453-471.

External links
Official Maturango Museum website: Information + tours.
Maturango Museum: photos
Archeology Program: Coso Rock Art, at National Park Service
Dating Coso Projectile Points
Coso Rock Art and the Coso Bighorn Sheep Cult 
Visiting the Coso Petroglyphs at  Naval Air Weapons Station China Lake

Petroglyphs Tour Info

Maturango Museum, 100 E. Las Flores Ave., Ridgecrest, CA 93555; (760) 375-6900, http://www.maturango.org . 
Naval Air Weapons Station, (760) 939-1683, NAWS China Lake - Petroglyph Tours
Rock Art 101, rock art training seminars  http://www.rockart101.com
Ridgecrest Petroglyph and Heritage Festival, http://www.rpfestival.com

Petroglyphs in California
Native American history of California
Northern Paiute|Coso
History of the Mojave Desert region
History of Inyo County, California
Historic districts on the National Register of Historic Places in California
National Historic Landmarks in California
Protected areas of the Mojave Desert
Protected areas of Inyo County, California
Archaeological sites on the National Register of Historic Places in California
National Register of Historic Places in Inyo County, California